Joseph Francis Hagan (better known as Philadelphia Jack O'Brien) (January 17, 1878 – November 12, 1942) was the world light heavyweight boxing champion in 1905 when he defeated Bob Fitzsimmons for the universal world title. Rather than defending his title, O'Brien instead abandoned it in order to fight at heavyweight. Nat Fleischer, founder and editor of [[The Ring (magazine)|The Ring Magazine]], ranked O'Brien as the No. 2 All-Time Light Heavyweight, and famed boxing promoter Charley Rose ranked him as the No. 3 All-Time Light Heavyweight. O'Brien was inducted into the Ring Magazine hall of fame in 1968, the World Boxing Hall of Fame in 1987, and the International Boxing Hall of Fame in 1994.

Biography

Born in Philadelphia, Hagan was the older brother to Young Jack O'Brien and the cousin of heavyweight boxer Jack Rowan.

To mark his sixtieth birthday in early 1938 he was the subject of a 5000-word profile in The New Yorker by A J Liebling.  

O'Brien turned pro in the 1890s. He stood 5-10½ and weighed between 152 and 165 pounds. He was agile, quick and limber, a two-handed puncher who landed often but not a particularly hard hitter. His best punches were a left jab and a hard overhand right, and he was a good defensive fighter who blocked punches well and counterpunched accurately.

By 1900 he weighed 155 pounds, but with many good men fighting at this weight their talents were at a discount. O'Brien conceived the idea of going to England where, he heard, the competition was softer. He knocked out Dido Plum, the British middleweight champion, in six rounds, and George Crisp, the heavyweight titleholder, in eleven.

O'Brien returned to Philadelphia in May 1902 and on December 20, 1905, won the world light heavyweight championship with a 13-round RTD over Bob Fitzsimmons in San Francisco, California, but abandoned the title without ever defending it. He challenged world heavyweight champion Tommy Burns on November 28, 1906, in Los Angeles, and got a 20-round draw. The referee was former world champion James J. Jeffries. O'Brien challenged Burns again in Los Angeles on May 8, 1907, and this time Burns won the 20-round decision. He fought the fearsome middleweight champion Stanley Ketchel in a 10-round No Decision on March 26, 1909, in which O'Brien was saved by the bell at the end of the 10th round. He fought heavyweight champion Jack Johnson in a six-round No Decision on May 19, but on June 9 he faced Ketchel again and was beaten in three rounds.

Hagan managed a gym on the seventh and top floors of the Rosemont building at 1658 Broadway, New York City, in the late 1920s/early 1930s.  World middleweight champion Harry Greb trained in O'Brien's at gym, and the only existing films of Greb in action are workouts and sparring with O'Brien.

He died on November 12, 1942.

O'Brien was also the chief second to Jack Dempsey at the 1926 Dempsey-Tunney bout in Philadelphia.

Retiring in 1910, counting newspaper decisions stands at 192 fights 147–16–24 (5 no contests) with 55 knockouts.

In popular culture

Philadelphia Jack O'Brien is a featured character in The Killings of Stanley Ketchel'' (2005), a novel by James Carlos Blake.

Professional boxing record
All information in this section is derived from BoxRec, unless otherwise stated.

Official record

All newspaper decisions are officially regarded as “no decision” bouts and are not counted in the win/loss/draw column.

Unofficial record

Record with the inclusion of newspaper decisions in the win/loss/draw column.

See also
List of light heavyweight boxing champions

References

External links

 
 
 Philadelphia Jack O'Brien - Cyber Boxing Zone Encyclopedia

Boxers from Philadelphia
Light-heavyweight boxers
International Boxing Hall of Fame inductees
1878 births
1942 deaths
American male boxers